Tjore is a village in Grimstad municipality in Agder county, Norway. The village is located on the southern shore of the Landvikvannet lake, just north of the European route E18 highway.

References

Villages in Agder
Grimstad